Hans-Georg Betz is an academic at the University of Zurich. He is the author of several books on right-wing populism including Radical Right-Wing Populism in Western Europe and The New Politics of the Right: Neo-Populist Parties and Movements in Established Democracies.

References

Academics and writers on far-right extremism
Populism scholars
Living people
Year of birth missing (living people)
Academic staff of the University of Zurich
Place of birth missing (living people)